Polyclithrum is a genus of monogeneans in the family Gyrodactylidae.

Species
Polyclithrum alberti Ernst, Whittington & Jones, 2000
Polyclithrum boegeri Ernst, Whittington & Jones, 2000
Polyclithrum corallense Ernst, Whittington & Jones, 2000
Polyclithrum gerasevi Gaevskaya & Dmitrieva, 1997
Polyclithrum mugilini Rogers, 1967
Polyclithrum ponticum Gerasev, Dmitrieva & Gaevskaya, 2002
Polyclithrum rodgersi Dmitrieva, Gerasev, Gibson, Pronkina & Galli, 2012

References

Gyrodactylidae
Monogenea genera